FC Porto followed up its UEFA Champions League victory with a chaotic season, following the departure of coach José Mourinho and several key players. Initial coach Luigi Delneri was sacked even before the season started, due to too little presence in his new town in pre-season. New signings Ricardo Quaresma, Pepe, Giourkas Seitaridis, Luís Fabiano, Raul Meireles and Diego looked spectacular on paper, but in reality, Porto had a miserable offensive performance, culminating in just 39 league goals and a loss of the league title to arch rivals Benfica. As a consolation, it won the Intercontinental Cup title with a victory against Once Caldas on penalties.

Squad

Goalkeepers
  Vítor Baía
  Nuno

Defenders
  Jorge Costa
  Pedro Emanuel
  Pepe
  Ricardo Costa
  Miguel Areias
  Nuno Valente
  César Peixoto
  José Bosingwa
  Giourkas Seitaridis
  Mário Silva
  Evaldo

Midfielders
  Leandro
  Hugo Leal
  Diego
  Ricardo Quaresma
  Maniche
  Carlos Alberto
  Raul Meireles
  Léo Lima
  Ricardo Fernandes
  Ibson

Attackers
  Luís Fabiano
  Derlei
  Maciel
  Hélder Postiga
  Hugo Almeida
  Benni McCarthy
  Pitbull

Primeira Liga

League table

Matches

 Porto-União de Leiria 1-1
 1-0 Ricardo Quaresma 
 1-1 Petar Krpan 
 Braga-Porto 1-1
 0-1 Maniche 
 1-1 Wender 
 Porto-Estoril 2-2
 0-1 Ousmane N'Doye 
 1-1 Luís Fabiano 
 1-2 Pinheiro 
 2-2 Pepe 
 Vitória de Guimarães-Porto 0-1
 0-1 Costinha 
 Porto-Belenenses 3-0
 1-0 Maniche 
 2-0 Benni McCarthy 
 3-0 Benni McCarthy 
 Benfica-Porto 0-1
 0-1 Benni McCarthy 
 Porto-Penafiel 2-0
 1-0 Benni McCarthy 
 2-0 Benni McCarthy 
 Nacional-Porto 2-2
 0-1 Diego 
 0-2 Benni McCarthy 
 1-2 Raul Meireles 
 2-2 Adriano 
 Porto-Sporting CP 3-0
 1-0 Benni McCarthy 
 2-0 Diego 
 3-0 Carlos Alberto 
 Gil Vicente-Porto 0-2
 0-1 Ricardo Quaresma 
 0-2 Costinha 
 Porto-Boavista 0-1
 0-1 Cafú 
 Vitória Setúbal-Porto 0-1
 0-1 Jorge Costa 
 Porto-Beira-Mar 0-1
 0-1 Beto 
 Marítimo-Porto 1-1
 1-0 Pena 
 1-1 Luís Fabiano 
 Porto-Moreirense 1-0
 1-0 Maniche 
 Porto-Rio Ave 1-1
 0-1 Gaúcho 
 1-1 Luís Fabiano 
 Académica-Porto 0-0
 União de Leiria-Porto 0-1
 0-1 Ricardo Costa 
 Porto-Braga 1-3
 0-1 João Tomás 
 1-1 Diego 
 1-2 Wender 
 1-3 João Tomás 
 Estoril-Porto 1-2
 0-1 José Bosingwa 
 0-2 Ricardo Quaresma 
 1-2 Fellahi 
 Porto-Vitória de Guimarães 0-0
 Belenenses-Porto 0-1
 0-1 Costinha 
 Porto-Benfica 1-1
 1-0 Benni McCarthy 
 1-1 Geovanni 
 Penafiel-Porto 1-2
 1-0 Wesley 
 1-1 Pedro Emanuel 
 1-2 Benni McCarthy 
 Porto-Nacional 0-4
 0-1 Miguel Fidalgo 
 0-2 Alonso 
 0-3 Nuno Viveiros 
 0-4 Bruno 
 Sporting CP-Porto 2-0
 1-0 Liédson 
 2-0 Carlos Martins 
 Porto-Gil Vicente 1-0
 1-0 Hélder Postiga 
 Boavista-Porto 1-0
 1-0 Cadú 
 Porto-Vitória Setúbal 2-1
 0-1 Albert Meyong 
 1-1 Hélder Postiga 
 2-1 Ricardo Quaresma 
 Beira-Mar-Porto 0-1
 0-1 Ricardo Quaresma 
 Porto-Marítimo 1-0
 1-0 Benni McCarthy 
 Moreirense-Porto 1-1
 1-0 Nei 
 1-1 Hélder Postiga 
 Rio Ave-Porto 0-2
 0-1 Benni McCarthy 
 0-2 Leandro 
 Porto-Académica 1-1
 1-0 Ibson 
 1-1 Joeano

Topscorers
  Benni McCarthy 11
  Ricardo Quaresma 4
  Luís Fabiano 3
  Diego 3
  Hélder Postiga 3

UEFA Champions League

Group stage

 Porto-CSKA Moskva 0-0
 Chelsea-Porto 3-1
 1-0 Alexey Smertin 
 2-0 Didier Drogba 
 2-1 Benni McCarthy 
 3-1 John Terry 
 Paris Saint-Germain-Porto 2-0
 1-0 Charles-Édouard Coridon 
 2-0 Pauleta 
 Porto-Paris Saint-Germain 0-0
 CSKA Moskva-Porto 0-1
 0-1 Benni McCarthy 
 Porto-Chelsea 2-1
 0-1 Damien Duff 
 1-1 Diego 
 2-1 Benni McCarthy

First knockout round

 Porto-Internazionale 1-1
 0-1 Obafemi Martins 
 1-1 Ricardo Costa 
 Internazionale-Porto 3-1
 1-0 Adriano 
 2-0 Adriano 
 2-1 Jorge Costa 
 3-1 Adriano

References 

FC Porto seasons
Porto